Virginia elected its members in April 1819, after the new congress began but before the first session convened.

See also 
 1818 Virginia's 19th congressional district special election
 1818 and 1819 United States House of Representatives elections
 List of United States representatives from Virginia

Notes 

1819
Virginia
United States House of Representatives